Broken Barriers, also known as Khava (Yiddish: חוה) is a 1919 American Yiddish silent film, based on author Sholem Aleichem's stock character Tevye the Dairyman.

Cast
 Alice Hastings – Khava (Chava) 
 Alexander Tenenholtz – Fedka (Fyedka)
 Giacomo Masuroff – Tobias (Tevye)
 Billie Wilson – Khava's Mother (Golde) 
 Sonia Radin – Parasha
 Ivan, Fedka's Father
 Hanna (Ganna Kehlmann) Kay – Khavah's Sister (Tzeitel)
 Raymond (John Raymond) Friedgen – Fedka's chum (friend)

Production

Release and restoration
Long thought to be a lost film, an original copy was donated to the National Center for Jewish Film at Brandeis University for restoration by a descendant of one of the actors. The same story was the basis of the 1964 stage musical Fiddler on the Roof and its 1971 film version, though the fate of Khava in the ending had been altered.

See also
List of rediscovered films

References

External links

 
 Thomas Pryor, A Ukrainian Village Is Erected on a Long Island Farm for a Yiddish Film Drama, The New York Times, July 30, 1939.

1919 films
Silent films
1919 drama films
American black-and-white films
Films about Jews and Judaism
Films based on short fiction
Yiddish-language films
1910s rediscovered films
American silent feature films
Silent American drama films
1910s Russian-language films
Rediscovered American films
1910s American films